Teresita Rigo Durango Magalona (born Teresita Rigo Durango; September 30, 1928 – April 27, 1990), known professionally as Tita Duran, was a Filipina film actress who began as a child actress. She was the first successful child star of Philippine cinema.

Career
Duran joined a movie in her early career as an eight-year-old child abandoned by her mother in 1936 family-drama of Awit ng mga Ulila ("The Songs of the Orphans").

In 1938, Sampaguita Pictures spotted the child and cast her in a tear-jerker movie titled Inang Mahal ("Dear Mother"). Her second movie for Sampaguita was Ang Magsasampaguita (The Sampaguita Vendor).

Duran made two movies under LVN Pictures: Pangarap ("Dream") and Sawing Gantimpala ("Lost Prize") both in 1940.

After World War II, she made a comeback in her studio Sampaguita Pictures. She joined in a war film with Carmen Rosales titled Guerilyera and typecasted in numerous musical films paired by some of Sampaguita's finest actors. Her last movie with Sampaguita was Isang Halik Mo Pancho. She made Maria Went to Town under Deegar Cinema Inc. Her career is similar to that of Hollywood's Shirley Temple.

Personal life
Duran was married to Pancho Magalona on October 2, 1948. She was the mother of Francis Magalona and grandmother to Maxene Magalona.

Duran was also the aunt of singer and television personality, Regine Velasquez, as Velasquez' father was Duran's first cousin.

Filmography

1936 - Awit ng mga Ulila
1936 - Sa Paanan ng Krus
1937 - Milagro ng Nazareno sa Quiapo
1937 - Anak ng Kadiliman
1938 - Inang Mahal
1938 - Ang Magmamani
1938 - Alipin ng Palad
1938 - Mariang Alimango
1938 - Ang Pusong Wasak
1939 - Anak ng Hinagpis
1939 - Tatlong Pagkabirhen
1939 - Tunay Na Ina
1939 - Palaboy ng Diyos
1939 - Ang Magsasampaguita
1940 - Awit ng Magulang
1940 - Pangarap
1940 - Lihim ng Lumang Simbahan
1940 - Sa Duyang ng Pagmamahal
1940 - Sawing Gantimpala
1940 - Bahaghari
1940 - Nang Mahawi Ang Ulap
1941 - Panambitan
1941 - Paraiso
1946 - Guerilyera
1946 - Maynila
1947 - Lantang Asahar
1947 - Ang Kapilya sa May Daang Bakal
1947 - Dahil sa Ina
1948 - Ang Anak ng Dagat
1948 - Pamana ng Tulisan
1948 - Bulaklak na Walang Pangalan
1948 - Dahil sa Iyo
1948 - Tatlong Puso
1948 - Maharlika
1949 - Always kay ganda mo
1949 - Ulilang Kalapati
1949 - Tala sa Umaga
1949 - Milagro ng Birhen ng mga Rosas
1949 - Sa Piling Mo
1950 - Huwag Ka ng Magtampo!
1950 - Umaga na Giliw
1950 - Kay Ganda Mo Neneng
1951 - Kasintahan sa Pangarap
1952 - Barbaro
1952 - Buhay Pilipino
1952 - Cumbanchera
1953 - Ang Ating Pag-ibig
1953 - Sa Isang Sulyap Mo Tita
1953 - Vod-A-Vil
1954 - Sa Isang Halik Mo Pancho
1955 - Maria Went to Town
1956 - Mr. & Mrs.
1956 - Rockin' the Cha-Cha
1956 - Bella Filipina
1957 - Bicol Express
1957 - Yaya Maria
1958 - Tatak ni Solomon
1977 - Sinong Kapiling? Sinong Kasiping?
1983 - Bundok ng Susong Dalaga
1988 - Isusumbong Kita sa Diyos

References

External links

1928 births
1990 deaths
20th-century Filipino actresses
Actresses from Cebu
Filipino child actresses
Tita
People from Cebu City